Tung Chi College was a private Chinese secondary school located at No. 15, Kennedy Road, in Wan Chai, Hong Kong. The building has been mostly demolished.

History
The school was established in February 1936. Before being located at Kennedy Road, the school had been located at Hennessy Road and later at Wan Chai Road.

The college stopped admitting students in the 1970s. In the mid-1980s, the building was damaged by a fire.

The school was featured in several films, including the 1992 Hong Kong film Shogun and Little Kitchen.

References

External links
 Picture of the now demolished Tung Chi College building, Kennedy Road
 Pictures of the ruins:    

Defunct schools in Hong Kong
Former buildings and structures in Hong Kong